Pedro Rodriguez is a theologian who specializes on church studies or ecclesiology. He has written dozens of books and articles on theology. He is priest of the prelature of Opus Dei. He teaches at the University of Navarra in Pamplona, Spain and was its dean of theology for many years.

Works

Rodriguez's critical edition of the original manuscript of the Catechismus Romanus, the catechism of the Council of Trent, was praised by Joseph Cardinal Ratzinger as being of "great significance" for his own work on the Catechism of the Catholic Church. 

William May has praised him for his work of analyzing Opus Dei and the founder's teachings, saying that "he has masterfully" discussed the founder's teachings on holiness.

Some of Rodriguez's other works are:

Critical edition. Roman Catechism.
The Primacy of the Pope in the Church
Rodriguez, Pedro, Particular Churches and Personal Prelatures. Dublin, Four Courts Press, 1986.
Rodriguez, Pedro; Pío G. Aves de Sousa y José Manuel Zumaquero (eds.). Mons. Josemaría Escrivá de Balaguer y el Opus Dei en el 50 Aniversario de su Fundación (2° ed.). Pamplona, Ediciones Universidad de Navarra, 1985.
 Pedro Rodriguez, Fernando Ocáriz, and Jose Luis Illanes, Opus Dei in the Church: An ecclesiological study of the life and apostolate of Opus Dei, Princeton 1994
 Rodriguez, Vocación, trabajo, contemplación (Pamplona: EUNSA, 1986)
Rodriguez, Camino: edición critico-histórica, (Instituto Histórico Josemaría Escrivá) – 1250 pages of analysis of Escriva's main work, The Way.

References

Living people
20th-century Spanish Roman Catholic theologians
Opus Dei members
Year of birth missing (living people)
Academic staff of the University of Navarra
21st-century Spanish Roman Catholic theologians